The Sacred Name Movement (SNM) refers to the movement within Adventism which, prompted by Joseph Franklin Rutherford, were concerned with the Hebrew name of God, a concern that led the Zion's Watch Tower Tract Society to the adoption of the name Jehovah's Witnesses. Within the movement the concern with the name was, influenced by Clarence Orvil Dodd, as important as Jewish festivals. SNM believers also generally observe many of the Old Testament laws and ceremonies such as the Seventh-day Sabbath, Torah festivals, and kashrut food laws.

Beliefs
The Sacred Name Movement includes various small groups (such as Yahweh's Assembly in Messiah, and Yahweh's Assembly in Yahshua) generally unified by the use of the name Yahweh and a Hebraic form for the name of God's son (such as Yahshua). SNM groups generally maintain the seventh day Sabbath (Friday sunset to Saturday sunset) along with the Jewish feast days such as Passover and the Feast of Weeks. They believe that the Torah law was not abolished. They believe that Yahshua is the son of Yahweh, and that his life, death, burial, and resurrection provide salvation. They believe that after persons repent of their sins, they should be baptized in the name of Yahshua.

SNM groups reject Easter and Christmas as pagan in origin. The movement also rejects the doctrine of the Trinity as unbiblical. Groups within the movement have differed on doctrinal points, such as the wearing of beards and about what constitutes a Sabbath rest.
Though it has similar beliefs, the Assemblies of Yahweh (headquartered in Bethel, Pennsylvania) distanced itself from the Sacred Name Movement, referring to it as "disorganisation" and "confusion".

History
The Sacred Name Movement arose in the early 20th century out of the Church of God (Seventh Day) movement. This movement was influenced by Joseph Franklin Rutherford who changed the name of the main branch of the Bible Student movement to Jehovah's Witnesses in 1931, based on his belief in the importance of the Hebrew name of God. C. O. Dodd, a member of the Church of God (Seventh Day), began to keep the Jewish festivals (including Passover) in 1928, adopting sacred name doctrines in the late 1930s. To promote his views, Dodd began to publish The Faith magazine in 1937. American religious scholar J. Gordon Melton wrote, "No single force in spreading the Sacred Name movement was as important as The Faith magazine."

Sacred Name Bibles

Angelo Traina, a disciple of Dodd, undertook the production of a Sacred Name edition of the Bible, publishing the Holy Name New Testament in 1950 and the Holy Name Bible in 1962, both based on the King James Version, but with some names and words changed to Hebraic forms, such as "God" to "Elohim", "LORD" to "Yahweh" and "Jesus" to "Yahshua". Other Sacred Name Bibles have since been produced, and most Sacred Name Movement denominations use a Sacred Name Bible.

See also
 Christian views on the Old Covenant
 Ebionites
 Holy Name of Jesus
 Judaizers

References

Sources 

 
Adventism
Christian belief and doctrine